Áron Szilágyi (born 14 January 1990) is a Hungarian right-handed sabre fencer. 

Szilágyi is a 2018 team European champion, 2015 individual European champion, 2007 team world champion, and 2022 individual world champion.

A four-time Olympian, Szilágyi is a three-time individual Olympic champion and 2021 team Olympic bronze medalist. Szilágyi competed in the 2008 Beijing Olympic Games, the 2012 London Olympic Games, the 2016 Rio de Janeiro Olympic Games, and the 2020 Tokyo Olympic Games.

In Tokyo, Szilágyi became the only male fencer in history to win three individual Olympic gold medals.

Szilágyi has served as the president of the Vasas Sport Club Fencing Division since 2020.

Career

Szilágyi began fencing at age nine at Vasas SC in Budapest, which remains his club . His first coach was György Gerevich, whom he considers as his personal hero alongside György's father, seven-time Olympic champion Aladár Gerevich.

While he was still a cadet, Szilágyi joined the senior Hungarian team for the 2007 World Fencing Championships in Saint-Petersburg. Hungary won their first gold medal in men's sabre since 1998 after defeating France 45–43. For this performance, Tamás Decsi, Balázs Lontay, Zsolt Nemcsik and Áron Szilágyi were named Hungarian team of the year.

He competed in the 2008 Beijing Olympics, finishing 15th in the individual event and 7th in the team event. He earned team bronze in the 2009 World Fencing Championships in Antalya, and placed third in the individual event of the 2011 European Fencing Championships in Sheffield.

The only Hungarian to qualify to the men's sabre event of the 2012 Summer Olympics, he was seeded no.5. In the table of 16 he defeated 2008 Olympic champion Zhong Man of China, then overcame Germany's Max Hartung and Russia's Nikolay Kovalev to reach the final. After taking an early 7-0 lead over Italy's Diego Occhiuzzi, Szilágyi closed the match on 15–8 to win Hungary's first gold medal in the London games.

Szilágyi featured on the official poster and video campaign of the 2013 World Fencing Championships held in his home city, Budapest. He was defeated in the semi-finals by Nikolay Kovalev and took the bronze medal. In the team event, Hungary was eliminated in the table of 8 by Romania and finished 7th after the ranking matches. Szilágyi finished the season world no.2, a career best .

In the 2014–15 season Szilágyi claimed his first continental title in Montreux, after prevailing over Max Hartung despite a right-ankle injury. Hartung took his revenge in the 2015 World Fencing Championships by defeating Szilágyi in the quarter-finals of the individual event. 

After the competition Szilágyi announced that he would prepare for the 2016 Summer Olympics in Rio de Janeiro with András Decsi, Singapore's national coach and elder brother to Szilágyi's teammate Tamás. He won his second gold medal at the 2016 Olympics, defeating Daryl Homer 15-8 in the final.

At the 2020 Summer Olympics, Szilágyi won his third gold medal, defeating  Luigi Samele 15-7 in the final.

He won the gold medal in the men's sabre event at the 2022 World Fencing Championships held in Cairo, Egypt.

Medal record

Olympic Games

World Championship

European Championship

Grand Prix

World Cup

Personal life
Szilágyi studied international relations at Eötvös Loránd University in Budapest. Beside his degree in international relations, he also holds a degree in psychology from Károli Gáspár University.

He got married in 2017.

Awards
Hungarian Sportsman of the Year: 2016, 2021
Hungarian Junior fencer of the Year: 2006, 2009
Junior Príma award (2010)
Hungarian Fencer of the Year (6): 2011, 2012, 2016, 2018, 2020, 2021
Honorary Citizen of Budapest (2012)
FIE Fair Play Award: 2019

Orders and special awards
  Order of Merit of Hungary – Officer's Cross (2012)
  Order of Merit of Hungary – Commander's Cross (2016)
  Order of Merit of Hungary – Grand Cross (2021)

References

External links

 
 
 
 
 
 
  
  

Hungarian male sabre fencers
Living people
1990 births
Olympic fencers of Hungary
Fencers at the 2008 Summer Olympics
Fencers at the 2012 Summer Olympics
Fencers at the 2016 Summer Olympics
Fencers at the 2020 Summer Olympics
Olympic gold medalists for Hungary
Olympic bronze medalists for Hungary
Olympic medalists in fencing
Martial artists from Budapest
Medalists at the 2012 Summer Olympics
Medalists at the 2016 Summer Olympics
Medalists at the 2020 Summer Olympics
World Fencing Championships medalists
20th-century Hungarian people
21st-century Hungarian people